Fritz Lange (21 June 1864 in Dessau – 19 November 1952 in Wackersberg) was a German orthopedic surgeon.

He studied medicine at the universities of Jena, Leipzig and Munich, receiving his doctorate in 1892. He furthered his education in Rostock and Strasbourg, where he was pupil of Otto Wilhelm Madelung. In 1895 he studied orthopedics under Adolf Lorenz in Vienna, and during the following year, obtained his habilitation for orthopedic surgery. In 1908 he became a full professor of orthopedics at the University of Munich.

In 1909 he was named president of the Deutsche Gesellschaft für Orthopädische Chirurgie (German Society for Orthopedic Surgery). He was an editor of the periodical "Münchener Medizinischen Wochenschrift" (Munich Medical Weekly).

He made contributions in his research of congenital hip dislocation, torticollis, scoliosis and spinal tuberculosis. He is remembered for his pioneer work with tendon transplants and artificial ligaments (made of silk).

Selected works 
 Chirurgie und orthopädie im kindesalter, with Hans Spitzy, 1910 – Surgery and orthopedics in childhood.
 Lehrbuch der Orthopädie, 1914 – Textbook of orthopedics.
 Die behandlung der knochenbrüche durch den praktischen arzt, 1926 – On treatment of bones.
 Die epidemische kinderlähmung, 1930 – The polio epidemic.
 Die sprache des menschlichen antlitzes; eine wissenschaftliche physiognomik und ihre praktische verwertung im leben und in der kunst, 1937 – Language of the human face; scientific physiognomy and its practical utilization in life and art.

References 

1864 births
1952 deaths
People from Dessau-Roßlau
University of Jena alumni
Ludwig Maximilian University of Munich alumni
Leipzig University alumni
Academic staff of the Ludwig Maximilian University of Munich
German orthopedic surgeons